Liddie is a surname. Notable people with the surname include:

 Edward Liddie (born 1959), American judoka
 Ricardo Liddie (born 1966), retired sprinter from Saint Kitts and Nevis

See also
 Liddy, a list of people with the surname, given name or nickname
 Lidy, a list of people with the given name or nickname